Cecilia Harvey is a technology executive, author and entrepreneur. She is the founder of Tech Women Today.

Early life and education 
Harvey was born in New York City and grew up in Westchester County in Tarrytown, New York. She attended The Ursuline School in New Rochelle, New York. In 1996, Harvey enrolled at Wellesley College, in 2000 with a bachelor's degree in political science.

Career
After graduating from Wellesley, Harvey entered the sales and trading analyst program at Lehman Brothers in 2000. She has since worked in the financial technology industry in various positions, including former COO of Citigroup Markets and Securities Services Technology, consultant with HSBC, and senior positions with Morgan Stanley, Barclays Capital and IBM Consulting.

Harvey is a regular columnist for Thrive Global and Entrepreneur Magazine.

She conducted research into Queen bee syndrome at work.

Tech Women Today 
In 2018, Harvey founded Tech Women Today, a professional organization that seeks to advance women in technology across various sectors. Tech Women Today is also a resource for non-technical female entrepreneurs who need to leverage technology to grow their business. On the Tech Women Today YouTube channel Harvey interviews female technology entrepreneurs and shares advice with up and coming women in technology.

Books

Accolades 
 2019 EmPower 100 Ethnic Minority Role Model List
 2019 Inclusive Tech Alliance Awards Finalist

References

External links
 Tech Women Today Official

British women company founders
British chief executives
Technology company founders
Wellesley College alumni
Living people
Women business executives
Year of birth missing (living people)